Helen Gardner may refer to:

Helen Gardner (critic) (1908–1986), English critic and academic
Helen Gardner (art historian) (1878–1946), American art historian and educator
Helen Gardner (actress) (1884–1968), silent film actress
 Helen H. Gardener (1853–1925), American author, rationalist public intellectual, political activist, and government functionary